The Karminski was an English automobile manufactured only in 1902.

The Karminski was the product of a concern from Bradford. The bonnet of the 7 hp car came to a "torpedo point".  In 1902 the company claimed that it was unable to supply the similar 12 hp model "owing to a contract by a Russian firm for a great quantity".

See also 
 List of car manufacturers of the United Kingdom

References
David Burgess Wise, The New Illustrated Encyclopedia of Automobiles
Defunct motor vehicle manufacturers of England
Manufacturing companies based in Bradford
Veteran vehicles